Malik Deenar Institute of Management Studies , Seethangoli is an MBA college in Kasaragod, India.

History
The college opened in 2009.  It got affiliated to Kannur University in the same year.  The college is located in the township of Seethangoli some 10 km from Kasaragod town.  The college is situated in a very scenic surroundings on the road from Kumbla to Badiyadka.

Courses offered
 MBA.

References

Colleges affiliated to Kannur University
Colleges in Kasaragod district
Business schools in Kerala